Nikolaos 'Nikos' Tsoumanis (8 June 1990 – October 2021) was a Greek professional footballer who played as a left-back.

Career
Tsoumanis left Panthrakikos as he did not renew his contract to join Veria on 9 July 2015. He later signed with major Greek club, Aris.

Death
Tsoumanis was found dead in his car on the morning of 5 October 2021. The medical examiner believed the cause of death to be suffocation. Police initially suspected "foul play" as his hands were bound. However, following further examination, Tsoumanis's death was ruled to be an accident.

Notes

References

External links
Insports profile 

1990 births
2021 deaths
Greek footballers
Makedonikos F.C. players
Association football fullbacks
Xanthi F.C. players
A.O. Kerkyra players
Aris Thessaloniki F.C. players
Panthrakikos F.C. players
Veria F.C. players
Apollon Pontou FC players
Super League Greece players
Deaths from asphyxiation
Accidental deaths in Greece
Footballers from Epirus (region)